Mark Kratzmann defeated Stefan Kruger in the final, 6–4, 4–6, 6–3 to win the boys' singles tennis title at the 1984 Wimbledon Championships.

Seeds

  Stephen Botfield (first round)
  Mark Kratzmann (champion)
  Jonas Svensson (semifinals)
  Brad Pearce (semifinals)
  Dan Nahirny (second round)
  Patrick McEnroe (third round)
  Thomas Muster (second round)
  Marius Masencamp (first round)
  Luke Jensen (quarterfinals)
  Andrei Chesnokov (third round)
  Felix Barrientos (quarterfinals)
  Éric Winogradsky (quarterfinals)
  Brett Custer (third round)
  David Macpherson (first round)
  Robbie Weiss (first round)
  Alex Antonitsch (second round)

Draw

Finals

Top half

Section 1

Section 2

Bottom half

Section 3

Section 4

References

External links

Boys' Singles
Wimbledon Championship by year – Boys' singles